The Republic of Poland Ambassador to Belarus is the official representative of the President and Government of Poland to the head of state of Belarus.

History 
Until 1991 the Byelorussian Soviet Socialist Republic had been a constituent SSR of the Soviet Union. Upon the breakup of the USSR, the Supreme Soviet of Belarus declared itself independent of the Soviet Union on August 25, 1991, and renamed itself the Republic of Belarus on September 19, 1991. The Republic of Poland recognised Belarus on March 2, 1992. An embassy was established in the capital, Minsk, in 1992, with Elżbieta Smułkowa as Chargé d’Affaires. Relations between Poland and Belarus have been continuous since that time.

Polish Embassy in Belarus is located in Minsk. Additionally there are Consulates General located in Brest and Grodno.

List of ambassadors of Poland to Belarus 

 1992-1995: Elżbieta Smułkowa (until 1992 chargé d’affaires)
 1995-1996: Marek Ziółkowski (chargé d’affaires)
 1996-1998: Ewa Spychalska
 1998: Piotr Żochowski (chargé d’affaires)
 1998-2002: Mariusz Maszkiewicz
 2002-2005: Tadeusz Pawlak
 2005: Marian Siemakowicz (chargé d’affaires)
 2005-2006: Aleksander Wasilewski (chargé d’affaires)
 2006-2010: Henryk Litwin
 2010-2011: Witold Jurasz (chargé d’affaires)
 2011-2015: Leszek Szerepka
 2016-2018: Konrad Pawlik
 2018: Michał Chabros (chargé d’affaires)
 since 2018: Artur Michalski

See also 

 Belarus–Poland relations

References 

Belarus
Poland
Ambassadors of Poland to Belarus